The 1974 United States Senate election in Utah took place on November 5, 1974 alongside other elections to the United States Senate in other states as well as elections to the United States House of Representatives and various state and local elections.

Incumbent Republican U.S. Senator Wallace F. Bennett did not run for re-election to a fifth term, but retired. Republican nominee Jake Garn defeated Democratic nominee Wayne Owens.

Nominations

Democratic nomination

Candidates
Donald Holbrook, attorney
Wayne Owens, U.S. Congressman for Utah's 2nd congressional district

Results
Owens defeated Holbrook at the state convention on July 12 to 13 with over 70% of the vote and therefore avoided a primary.

Republican nomination

Candidates
Jake Garn, incumbent Mayor of Salt Lake City
Dale R. Hawkins, Weber State College professor
Paul S. Knowlton, wholesaler
Byron Rampton, former State Senator

Results
Garn won over 70% of the vote at the state convention on July 27 and therefore avoided a primary.

American Party nomination

Candidates
Bruce Bangerter, American Independent nominee for Utah's 2nd congressional district in 1972
Kenneth R. Larsen

Eliminated at convention
Louie Youngkeit

Results

General election

Candidates
 Bruce Bangerter (American)
 Jake Garn, incumbent Mayor of Salt Lake City (Republican)
 Wayne Owens, incumbent U.S. Congressman (Democratic)

Results

See also 
 1974 United States Senate elections

References

Bibliography
 
 

United States Senate
Utah
1974